Miss Jenis is a 2020 Sri Lankan Sinhala comedy drama film directed by Susiran De Silva and produced by Walter Abeysundara. It stars late Jayalath Manoratne in lead dual roles along with Giriraj Kaushalya, Jayalal Rohana and Duleeka Marapana in supportive roles. Music composed by Lakshman Wijesekara.

It is the debut cinema direction of Susiran de Silva, where he has produced several popular television serials earlier such as Manokaya and Isuru Yogaya. The film also marks the final lead role of maestro Jayalath Manoratne who died in early 2020. This is unique to Sinhala cinema as his one and only female character. However in 2019, Manoratne and his wife came to see the film when it was shown to the film exhibition boards even though he showed a slight illness at that time.

The film was officially released on 25 September 2020. However, the film had his special screening on 7 September 2020 at The Scope Film Festival which was held from 4-8 September at Scope Cinemas, Liberty Complex. It was filmed in Haputale, Hikkaduwa and Colombo areas. The film received mixed views from critics.

Plot

Cast
 Jayalath Manoratne as Liyon aka 'Jenis'
 Giriraj Kaushalya		
 Duleeka Marapana		
 Roshan Ranawana		
 Jayalal Rohana		
 Udari Perera as Nimaya  		
 Kumara Thirimadura		
 Madani Malwaththa		
 Wasantha Kumarasiri				
 Angelo Sanjeev Barnes		
 Oshadi Himasha as Surangi 
 Kapila Samarakoon		
 Kumara Wanduressa

References

External links
 Miss Jenis on Sinhala Cinema Database
 
 Official trailer
 Official Facebook page
 ස්කෝප් - සරසවිය සිනමා උලෙළ අද මිස් ජෙනිස්
 මේ දවස්වල හැමෝම අහන්නේ ඔය ප්‍රශ්නය තමයි
 කාන්තා චරිතයක් මෙතෙක් කල් නොකරපු නිසා එය මට විශේෂයි
 සිනමාවට එක්වන සුරූපී නිළිය මිස් ජෙනිස්
 දන්න කියන නළු නිළියන්ගේ වෙනස්ම ආකාරයේ රඟපෑම්
 මං මිස් ජෙනිස් ජය­ලත් මනෝ­රත්න පළමු වරට කාන්තා චරි­ත­යක
 කොවිඩ් තිබුණත් රූකඩ පැංචි හා මිස් ජෙනිස් දිගටම

2020s Sinhala-language films
2020 films
Sri Lankan comedy films